Mary Victoria Price (born April 27, 1962) is an American public speaker and the author of the inspirational memoir, The Way of Being Lost: A Road Trip to My Truest Self and Vincent Price: A Daughter's Biography. She currently spends much of her time traveling and speaking about the life of her father, Vincent Price, as well as many inspirational self-development topics.

Early life
Price was born April 27, 1962, at St John's Hospital in Santa Monica, California, to actor Vincent Price and his second wife, Mary Grant Price. She has one older half-sibling, Vincent Barrett Price, born in 1940 to Vincent Price's first wife Edith Barrett. Victoria Price has a bachelor's degree in art history and theater from Williams College. She is currently PhD ABD in American Studies from the University of New Mexico.

Career 
Price has taught at the University of New Mexico, the New Mexico Highlands University, and the Philos School, an alternative arts-and-humanities school in Santa Fe.

She has worked as an interior designer, and has appeared on HGTV and in many design publications. She is also an interfaith/interspiritual minister, having been ordained in 2016. She is an inspirational speaker, giving talks internationally creativity, spirituality, wellness, art and design, as well as on the life of her father and other topics. She is on the board of the Vincent Price Art Museum in California.

She also appeared in the movie Edward Scissorhands, her father's last film, where she played a newscaster.

Selected publications 

Price is the author of the inspirational memoir, The Way of Being Lost: A Road Trip to My Truest Self.

In 1999, Price wrote Vincent Price: A Daughter's Biography, and released an updated version with changed acknowledgements in 2014.

She has also written the preface for a 50th anniversary edition of A Treasury of Great Recipes, a cookbook written by Vincent Price and his wife Mary.

Personal life
Price decided to come out as a lesbian in the 1980s. She is interested in Native American and African art, and horseback riding. She has her own blog, Daily Practice of Joy.

Although Victoria is the daughter of a horror icon, she is not a fan of horror films, but she is a fan of horror film fans. She often attends and speaks at horror conventions.

References

External links 
 
 Daily Practice of Joy by Victoria Price
 

1962 births
Living people
20th-century American biographers
American women biographers
20th-century American women writers
American lesbian writers
New Mexico Highlands University faculty
University of New Mexico alumni
Williams College alumni
Writers from Santa Monica, California
21st-century American women writers